
A by-election was held for the New South Wales Legislative Assembly seat of Ryde on 18 October 2008 to coincide with the Port Macquarie, Lakemba and Cabramatta by-elections. The by-election was triggered by the resignation of sitting member and Deputy Premier John Watkins, who cited exhaustion and the lack of time spent with his family for his resignation. Watkins resigned as Deputy Premier and Minister for Transport and retired from parliament on 8 September 2008, prompting a Cabinet reshuffle.

The by-election was won by Liberal candidate Victor Dominello on a swing of 23%. This was a marked turnaround to the result at the 2007 state election, when Watkins was reelected with 60.09% of the two-party preferred vote.  However, the writ was dropped at a very bad time for the government. Labor had been sinking in the polls since being reelected a year earlier. It had suffered from several months of bad press that had driven its poll numbers downward. It was only polling at 44% support, a swing of almost 8% from the 2007 election.  Additionally, Watkins' resignation had touched off a domino effect that ultimately resulted in Premier Morris Iemma leaving politics as well.

Watkins had held Ryde without interruption or serious difficulty since its re-creation in 1999, having held its predecessor seat of Gladesville since 1995.  Labor sat on a margin of 10.1%, which would have been considered safe under normal conditions (any seat with a two-party margin greater than 10% is considered safe on paper).  However, the seat had historically been marginal at the federal level.  Combined with Labor's declining poll numbers, commentators thought it was vulnerable to being taken by the Liberals.

On paper, Dominello's victory turned Ryde from a safe Labor seat into a safe Liberal seat in one stroke.   At the time, it was the largest swing against a sitting government in New South Wales history; it has since been outdone by the 2010 Penrith by-election (which saw a 25% swing against Labor) and the 2013 Miranda by-election (which saw a 26% swing against the Coalition).

The loss of Ryde significantly weakened the standing of Iemma's successor, Nathan Rees, who would himself be ousted in a party room coup a year later.  Labor would go on to suffer a landslide defeat at the 2011 state election.

Dates

Results

See also
Electoral results for the district of Ryde
List of New South Wales state by-elections

References

External links
 ABC District Profile & Election Coverage

2008 elections in Australia
New South Wales state by-elections
2000s in New South Wales